The Miss Ohio Scholarship Program selects the representative for the U.S. state of Ohio to compete for the title of Miss America. The pageant is held annually, during the "Miss Ohio Festival" week, at the historic 1,600 seat Renaissance Theatre (originally named the Ohio Theatre) in Mansfield.

Ohio representatives have won the Miss America pageant six times, joining California, and Oklahoma as the only states with six crowns. New York has the most winners with seven.  Ohio is the only state to have a contestant who won the Miss America title twice:
 1922 Mary Katherine Campbell, Columbus*
 1923 Mary Katherine Campbell, Columbus*
 1938 Marilyn Meseke, Marion
 1963 Jacquelyn Mayer, Sandusky
 1972 Laurie Lea Schaefer, Bexley
 1978 Susan Perkins, Middletown

*  When city representatives were common at the national pageant, Mary Katherine Campbell competed in Miss America Pageants as "Miss Columbus, Ohio".

The Miss Ohio pageant played a significant role in the saving of the Ohio Theatre and its renovation into the Renaissance Theatre. Mansfield originally hosted the Miss Ohio Pageant at the old Ohio Theatre from 1959 through 1962. After Jacquelyn Mayer, Miss Ohio 1962, was crowned Miss America 1963, the Miss Ohio pageant was relocated to the Ballroom Pavilion at Cedar Point Amusement Park in Sandusky. In 1975, the pageant returned to Mansfield, first to Malabar High School Auditorium from 1975 through 1978, then to the Madison Theatre in 1979. In 1980, it was decided to televise the pageant. Because of inadequate stage depth and backstage space at the Madison Theatre, then pageant producer Denny Keller and pageant set designer Paul Gilger persuaded the Miss Ohio Board of Directors to move the pageant back to Mansfield's Ohio Theatre, reopening the facility and sprucing it up for the pageant's first televised broadcast. The pageant's return to the old Ohio Theatre was the initial event that eventually led to the total renovation of the theatre and its reincarnation into the Renaissance Theatre. The Miss Ohio Scholarship Program has been held at the Renaissance Theatre since 1980, now for over 40 years.

Elizabetta Nies of Cincinnati was crowned on June 18, 2022 at Renaissance Theatre in Mansfield. She competed for the title of Miss America 2023 at the Mohegan Sun in Uncasville, Connecticut in December 2022 where she placed in the Top 11.

Results summary 
The following is a visual summary of the past results of Miss Ohio titleholders at the national Miss America pageants/competitions. The year in parentheses indicates the year of the national competition during which a placement and/or award was garnered, not the year attached to the contestant's state title.

Placements 
 Miss Americas: Mary Katherine Campbell (1922 and 1923), Marilyn Meseke (1938), Jacquelyn Mayer (1963), Laurie Lea Schaefer (1972), Susan Perkins (1978)
 1st runners-up: Mary Katherine Campbell (1924), Kathrine Baumann (1970), Tana Carli (1980), Melissa Ann Bradley (1985)
 2nd runners-up: Titilayo Adedokun (1994)
 3rd runners-up: Sharon Phillian (1967), Susan Banks (1976), Sher Patrick (1979)
 4th runners-up: Pamela Helean Rigas (1984), Kristin Huffman (1990)
 Top 10: Barbara Quinlin (1955), Kathy Vernon (1981), Suellen Cochran (1986), Robin Michelle Meade (1993), Lea Mack (1995), Mackenzie Bart (2015)
 Top 11: Elizabetta Nies (2023)
 Top 15: Pauline James (1924), Elsie Connor (1925), Evelyn Townley (1936), Evelyn Bertelsbeck (1938), Janice Sulzman (1941)
 Top 16: Evelyn Townley (1937), Jean Fadden (1937), LaVonne Bond (1946)
 Top 18: Corinne Porter (1933)

Awards

Preliminary awards
 Preliminary Lifestyle and Fitness: Kathrine Baumann (1970), Laurie Lea Schaefer (1972), Pamela Helean Rigas (1984), Suellen Cochran (1986), Alice Magoto (2017)
 Preliminary Talent: Barbara Patterson (1942), Joan Hyldoft (1943), Barbara Quinlin (1955), Sharon Phillian (1967), Kathrine Baumann (1970), Susan Banks (1976), Susan Perkins (1978), Tana Carli (1980), Suellen Cochran (1986), Kristin Huffman (1990), Titilayo Adedokun (1994), Mackenzie Bart (2015)

Non-finalist awards
 Non-finalist Talent: Karen Sparka (1973), Cheryl Yourkvitch (1974), Lorrie Kapsta (1975), Janice Cooley (1977), Juliana Zilba (1982), Sarah Ann Evans (1989), Robyn Hancock (1997), Amanda Beagle (2005)

Other awards
 Miss Congeniality: N/A
 Dr. David B. Allman Medical Scholarship: Juliana Zilba (1982)
 Charles & Theresa Brown Scholarship: Mackenzie Bart (2015)
 Evening Dress Award Third Prize: Mary Katherine Campbell (1922)
 Intercity Beauty Award: Mary Katherine Campbell (1922)
 Intercity Roller Chair Parade Third Prize: Leile Charles (1922)
 Quality of Life Award 2nd runners-up: Lea Mack (1995), Tiffany Haas (2003)
 Quality of Life Award Finalists: Ellen Bryan (2012)
 STEM Scholarship Award Winners: Mackenzie Bart (2015)
 Women in Business Scholarship Award Winners: Sarah Clapper (2018)

Winners

References

External links
 
 Official website

Ohio
Ohio culture
Women in Ohio
1922 establishments in Ohio
Recurring events established in 1922
Annual events in Ohio